Fathallah Omar (born 1966) is a Syrian writer and novelist.

Early life 
Omar was born in Jableh, Latakia Governorate in Syria. He earned his Ph.D. in communications engineering from Aleppo University.

Career 
Omar started his literary career as a novelist, later writing dramatic texts. He wrote scripts for a number of Syrian television shows, including the historical drama Ash-Shatat (The Diaspora), Al-Wahmoun, Wasmat Aar, and Last Gariya.

Selected works

Novels 
 Madaan Aleltehab (Dar Al Furat, 2014)
 Alqarabeen Alzaafa
 Raqset Albidaq (Beirut: Arab Scientific Publishers, 2015)

Movies 

 Lel-adala Kalema Akhera (2009)

Television shows 

 Ash-Shatat (The Diaspora), (2003)
 Al-Wahmoun (2006)
 Wasmat Aar (2007)
 Mawasem Alkhatar (2008)
 Al-Ghaliboun (2011)
 Darb Al-Yasmine (2015)
 Wojwooh Waraa Alwojooh (2015)
 Lasto Jarya (2016)
 Boh Alsanabel (2018)
 Marayia Alzaman (2020)

References 

1966 births
Living people
Syrian novelists
21st-century Syrian writers
Syrian television people
Syrian screenwriters
Television writers